Myrcia obversa is a plant in the family Myrtaceae. It is native to Northeast and Southeast Brazil.

References

obversa
Endemic flora of Brazil